Henri Aldebert (8 August 1880 – 24 April 1961) was a French bobsledder. He competed in the four-man event at the 1924 Winter Olympics.

References

1880 births
1961 deaths
French male bobsledders
Olympic bobsledders of France
Bobsledders at the 1924 Winter Olympics
Sportspeople from Paris